Eva Říhová (born 5 January 2000) is a Czech slalom canoeist who has competed at the international level since 2015.

She won two bronze medals in the C1 team event at the ICF Canoe Slalom World Championships (2017, 2019). She also won two bronze medals in the same event at the European Championships.

References

External links

Czech female canoeists
Living people
2000 births
Medalists at the ICF Canoe Slalom World Championships
21st-century Czech women